Robert Jay Hermann (born April 6, 1933) was the eighth Director of the National Reconnaissance Office.

Hermann was the major architect of the National Security Agency's expanded role in space reconnaissance. In addition, he advocated broadening the NRO's support to tactical military customers. Hermann was also responsible for establishing the Defense Reconnaissance Support Program.

In 1989, Hermann was elected a member of the National Academy of Engineering for conceiving and guiding applications of space technologies to national security.

References

External links
National Reconnaissance Office: Directors List

Directors of the National Reconnaissance Office
1933 births
Living people
Members of the United States National Academy of Engineering
Carter administration personnel
Reagan administration personnel